Trakan Phuet Phon is a district (amphoe) in the northern part of Ubon Ratchathani province, northeastern Thailand.

Geography
Neighboring districts are (from the northeast clockwise) Kut Khaopun, Pho Sai, Si Mueang Mai, Tan Sum, Don Mot Daeng, Lao Suea Kok of Ubon Ratchathani Province, Pathum Ratchawongsa and Phana district of Amnat Charoen province.

History
The district dates back to the Mueang Phana Nikhon (พนานิคม), which was a subordinate of Mueang Ubon Ratchathani. As the district office was in Ban Khulu, the district was renamed Khulu in 1917. In 1939 it was renamed Phana Nikhom, and finally named Trakan Phuet Phon the following year. The name Trakan Phuet Phon refers to 'beautiful crops'.

Administration
The district is divided into 23 sub-districts (tambons), which are further subdivided into 235 villages (mubans). Trakan Phuet Phon is a sub-district municipality (thesaban tambon) which covers tambon Khu Lu and parts of tambon Kham Charoen. There are a further 22 tambon administrative organizations (TAO).

References

External links
amphoe.com

Trakan Phuet Phon